Fawad Khan (born 20 November 1986) is a Pakistani first-class cricketer.

References

1986 births
Living people
Pakistani cricketers
Abbottabad cricketers
Federally Administered Tribal Areas cricketers
People from Bannu District
Peshawar cricketers
Peshawar Panthers cricketers